In finance, the noisy market hypothesis contrasts the efficient-market hypothesis in that it claims that the prices of securities are not always the best estimate of the true underlying value of the firm. It argues that prices can be influenced by speculators and momentum traders, as well as by insiders and institutions that often buy and sell stocks for reasons unrelated to fundamental value, such as for diversification, liquidity and taxes. These temporary shocks referred to as "noise" can obscure the true value of securities and may result in mispricing of these securities, potentially for many years.

References

See also
Adaptive market hypothesis
Agent-based computational economics
Financial economics #Challenges and criticism
Information cascade
Noise trader
Random walk hypothesis #A non-random walk hypothesis

Financial markets
Efficient-market hypothesis
Financial economics
Behavioral finance